A troubleshooter is someone who performs troubleshooting.

It may also refer to:

Music 
 Troubleshooter (EP), a 2022 EP by Kep1er
 Haegyeolsa ("Troubleshooter" or "Resolver"), a pop album released by the Korean boy band Shinhwa in 1998
 The Troubleshooters (album), a hip-hop music album by the Latino group Funkdoobiest in 1998.

Television 
 Troubleshooter (TV series), a British reality TV series aired between 1990-1993
 The Troubleshooters, a British TV series between 1965 and 1972
 The Troubleshooters (1959 TV series), an American TV series aired between 1959-1960
 "Trouble Shooter!", a 1988 episode of The Raccoons

Others 
 Troubleshooter (Hurwitz novel), a thriller fiction novel by Gregg Hurwitz in 2006
 Trouble Shooter, a video game released in Japan and Korea in 1991
 The Trouble Shooter, a 1924 American Western silent film in 1924
 Troubleshooter may refer to characters in the role-playing game Paranoia (1984 to 2017)

See also 
 Wikipedia:Troubleshooting